Iğdır University  is a university located in Iğdır, Turkey. It was established in 2008.

Affiliations
The university is a member of the Caucasus University Association.

References

External links
Website

Universities and colleges in Turkey
2008 establishments in Turkey
State universities and colleges in Turkey
Educational institutions established in 2008
Iğdır